Granolaria is a genus of sea snails, marine gastropod mollusks in the family Fasciolariidae, the spindle snails, the tulip snails and their allies.

Species
Species within the genus Granolaria include:
 Granolaria salmo (Wood, 1828)
 Granolaria valenciennesii (Kiener, 1840)
Species brought into synonymy
 Granolaria granosa (Broderip, 1832): synonym of Granolaria salmo (Wood, 1828)

References

 Snyder M.A., Vermeij G.J. & Lyons W.G. (2012) The genera and biogeography of Fasciolariinae (Gastropoda, Neogastropoda, Fasciolariidae). Basteria 76(1-3): 31-70

Fasciolariidae